Boronia hapalophylla is a plant in the citrus family Rutaceae and is endemic to New South Wales. It is an erect or straggling shrub with simple leaves, hairy branches and relatively large pink, four-petalled flowers.

Description
Flowering occurs mainly in August and September.

Taxonomy and naming
Boronia hapalophylla was first formally described in 2004 by Marco Duretto, John Edwards and Patricia Edwards who published the description in the journal Telopea. The specific epithet (hapalophylla) is said to be derived from the Ancient Greek word hapalo meaning "soft to touch" and phyllus meaning "leaf", referring to the soft, hairy surface of the leaves. In Ancient Greek "soft to touch" and "leaf" are however hapalos (ἁπαλός) and phyllon (φύλλον).

Distribution and habitat
This boronia is restricted to an area between Coutts Crossing and Shannon Creek near Glenreagh where it grows in woodland and in thick gully vegetation.

Conservation
Boronia hapalophylla is listed as "endangered" under the New South Wales Government Biodiversity Conservation Act 2016. The main threats to the species include habitat disturbance, weed invasion and trampling by domestic stock and feral herbivores.

References 

hapalophylla
Flora of New South Wales
Plants described in 2004